A Soor ploom (Scots for "sour plum") is a sharp-flavoured, round, green boiled sweet originally associated with Galashiels, Scotland. They are sold loose by weight in paper bags, traditionally in "quarters" — a quarter of a pound.

They are said to have been first made in 1337 in commemoration of a skirmish near Galashiels. A raiding party from England were overwhelmed and killed by local men when discovered eating unripe plums.

A "childhood favourite," they are pale green and "slightly acid in flavour". They have been featured in Oor Wullie and The Broons cartoons.

"Soor Plooms" is the motto of the town Galashiels.

There is a Border pipe tune from 1700 called "Soor Plooms of Galashiels".

References

Further reading
Google Scholar results
Google Books results

Soor ploom
Candy
Galashiels